Imanishi (written: 今西) is a Japanese surname. Notable people with the surname include:

, Japanese footballer
, Japanese ecologist and anthropologist
, Japanese ceramic artist
, Japanese tennis player

See also
Thereza Imanishi-Kari, Brazilian associate professor of pathology of Japanese descent
Imanishi Family Residence, one of a Group of Traditional Buildings in Imai-cho, Kashihara, Nara Prefecture, Japan

Japanese-language surnames